The following is a list of villages in the Cherkasy Oblast of Ukraine.

Cherkasy Raion 

 Biloziria
 Derenkovets
 Heronymivka
 Holovkivka
 Kostiantynivka
 Mezhyrich
 Ozeryshche
 Subotiv
 Trakhtemyriv
 Tymoshivka

Uman Raion 

 Ivanhorod
 Ladyzhynka
 Okhmativ
 Zelenyi Hai

Zolotonosha Raion 

 Blahodatne
 Novoukrainka

Zvenyhorodka Raion 

 Brodetske
 Lebedyn
 Maidanetske
 Mariaivka
 Moryntsi
 Talianky
 Vynohrad

Villages in Cherkasy Oblast
Cherkasy